Aprisma Management Technologies was created after Cabletron Systems was broken up into 4 smaller pieces, as the business unit to continue the highly successful SPECTRUM network management suite. It was acquired in early 2005 by Concord, which in turn was acquired by Computer Associates.

References

Defunct software companies of the United States